Nathaniel Giles (1558 – 1633 or 1634) was an English Renaissance organist and composer. He was the organist for Worcester Cathedral and wrote Anglican anthems.

While Master of the Children of the Chapel Royal he took over Blackfriars Theatre in a business arrangement with producer Henry Evans and there he worked with Ben Jonson on a children's company. Giles had the power under a royal warrant to impress children for service in the Chapel Royal. He allowed Evans and others to use the warrant to legally abduct children not for service as choir boys, but to work in their theatre. When in 1600 they abducted the son of a nobleman, this led to the Clifton Star Chamber Case.

He was also a master of the Choir of St George's Chapel, Windsor Castle and an organist at Westminster Abbey.

His Te Deum (Durham Cathedral manuscript A2, folio 56) has instructions for the organist to play an octave lower than written, and one assumes this is to give the 'dark' sonority of a 10 ft organ stop rather than the everyday colour of the standard 5 ft Principal stop of the Tudor organ. His Vestigia mea dirige was included in the manuscript collection known as the Dow Partbooks.

His son, Nathaniel Giles became a Canon of Windsor.

References

English classical composers
English Baroque composers
Renaissance composers
English organists
British male organists
1558 births
1630s deaths
16th-century English composers
17th-century English composers
17th-century classical composers
English male classical composers
Masters of the Children of the Chapel Royal
17th-century male musicians